The Westgate Bridge is a four-lane automobile crossing of the Kansas River at Topeka, Kansas, U.S.A.  The bridge runs concurrent with U.S. Highway 75.  The bridge extends from Interstate 70 across the river to NW 17th Street.

Bridges over the Kansas River
Road bridges in Kansas
U.S. Route 75
Bridges of the United States Numbered Highway System
Buildings and structures in Topeka, Kansas